The following is a list of mayors of White Rock, British Columbia.

 Charles Morris Defieux 1957
 William "Bill" Hodgson 1958–1959
 Harry T. Douglass 1960–1969
 John "Jack" Hynds 1970–1971
 Art Wall 1972–1973
 Don MacDonald 1974–1979
 Tom Kirstein 1980–1983
 Gordon J. Hogg 1984–1993
 Hardy Staub 1994–2002
 Judy Forster 2003–2008
 Catherine Ferguson 2008–2011
 Wayne Baldwin 2011–2018
 Darryl Walker 2018–2022
 Megan Knight 2022-present

References

External links

White Rock